The Two Sergeants (Italian:I due sergenti) may refer to:

 The Two Sergeants (play), an 1823 play by the French writer Théodore Baudouin d'Aubigny
 The Two Sergeants (1913 film), an Italian silent film directed by Eugenio Perego
 The Two Sergeants (1922 film), an Italian silent film directed by Guido Brignone
 The Two Sergeants (1936 film), an Italian film directed by Enrico Guazzoni
 The Two Sergeants (1951 film), an Italian film directed by Carlo Alberto Chiesa